Brand Indicators for Message Identification, or BIMI (pronounced: Bih-mee), is a specification allowing for the display of brand logos next to authenticated e-mails.  There are two parts to BIMI: a method for domain owners to publish the location of their indicators, and a means for Mail Transfer Agents (MTAs) to verify the authenticity of the indicator.

To implement BIMI, companies need a valid DMARC DNS record with a policy of either quarantine or reject, an exact square logo for the brand in SVG Tiny P/S format, and a DNS TXT record for the domain indicating the URI location of the SVG file. The only supported transport for the SVG URI is HTTPS.  The BIMI DNS record is in the following format:

default._bimi TXT "v=BIMI1; l=https://example.com/image.svg; a=https://example.com/image/certificate.pem"

Additionally, services such as Gmail require that a Verified Mark Certificate (VMC) be acquired and presented with the TXT record in order for the brand logo to be displayed in the inbox. These factors alone will not guarantee a BIMI logo will be displayed as heuristics (like spam and spoofing) and reputation will be a key part in BIMI validity.

Support
A working group of several companies named "BIMI Group" has formed to develop and support standardization of BIMI in IETF.

As of the October 3, 2020 the following e-mail services are implementing support for BIMI:

 Google's Gmail
 Yahoo! Mail
 Verizon Media (including AOL and Netscape e-mail services)
 Fastmail

Gmail began displaying verified trademarked logos on emails in July 2021.
Apple has added support for BIMI in Apple Mail with iOS 16, iPadOS 16, macOS Ventura, and iCloud.

References 

Email authentication